In the run up to the 2007 Polish parliamentary election, various organisations carried out opinion polling to gauge voting intention in Poland. Results of such polls are displayed in this article.

Opinion polls

2007

2006

2005

Notes

Poland
2007